Benjamin Franklin Jones Jr. (August 30, 1918 – July 25, 2009) was an American football coach and college athletics administrator.  He served as the head coach at Presbyterian College from 1957 to 1961 and at the University of Richmond from 1966 to 1973, compiling a career college football record of 68–60–3.

Death
Jones died in July 2009, at age 90 in Richmond, after suffering a stroke. A memorial service was held for him at the River Road Presbyterian church.
He was survived by his wife Jean whom he was married to for 56 years and his five children and 11 grandchildren.

Head coaching record

College

References

External links
 

1918 births
2009 deaths
Mississippi State Bulldogs football coaches
Presbyterian Blue Hose athletic directors
Presbyterian Blue Hose football coaches
Richmond Spiders athletic directors
Richmond Spiders football coaches
High school football coaches in Georgia (U.S. state)
Middle Georgia Warriors football players
People from Tift County, Georgia
Sportspeople from Macon, Georgia
Players of American football from Georgia (U.S. state)